is a railway station in the city of Tome, Miyagi Prefecture, Japan, operated by East Japan Railway Company (JR East).

Lines
Ishikoshi Station is served by the Tōhoku Main Line, and is located 423.5 rail kilometers from the official starting point of the line at Tokyo Station.

Station layout
Ishikoshi Station has one island platform and one side platform connected to the station building by a footbridge. The station has a "Midori no Madoguchi" staffed ticket office.

Platforms

History
Ishikoshi Station opened on 16 April 1890. The Kurihara Den'en Railway Line also served this station from 1921 to 2007. The station was absorbed into the JR East network upon the privatization of the Japanese National Railways (JNR) on 1 April 1987. A new station building was completed on 31 July 2011..  Ishikoshi station is the terminus for the Tōhoku Main Line in Miyagi. Trains to Iwate are available but must be changed to at the station.

Passenger statistics
In fiscal 2018, the station was used by an average of 306 passengers daily (boarding passengers only).

Surrounding area
Ishikoshi Post Office
former Ishikoshi Town Hall

See also
 List of Railway Stations in Japan

References

External links

   

Railway stations in Miyagi Prefecture
Tōhoku Main Line
Kurihara Den'en Railway Line
Railway stations in Japan opened in 1890
Tome, Miyagi
Stations of East Japan Railway Company